Influenza and Other Respiratory Viruses is a peer-reviewed scientific journal covering virology, published by John Wiley & Sons for the International Society for Influenza and other Respiratory Virus Diseases. As of 2018, the editor is Benjamin Cowling. According to the Journal Citation Reports, the journal has a 2020 impact factor of 4.380.

Influenza and Other Respiratory Viruses is the first journal to specialise exclusively on influenza and other respiratory viruses and strives to play a key role in the dissemination of information in this broad and challenging field.  It is aimed at laboratory and clinical scientists, public health professionals, and others around the world involved in a broad range of activities in this field.  In turn, topics covered will include:

 surveillance
 epidemiology
 prevention by vaccines
 prevention and treatment by antivirals
 clinical studies
 public health & pandemic preparedness
 basic scientific research
 transmission between animals and humans

References

Virology journals
Wiley (publisher) academic journals